Babyakovo is a rural locality (a selo) and the administrative center of Babyakovskoye Rural Settlement, Novousmansky District, Voronezh Oblast, Russia. The population was   2,678 as of 2010. There are 44 streets.

Geography 
Babyakovo is located 9 km northwest of Novaya Usman (the district's administrative centre) by road. Zerkalny is the nearest rural locality.

References 

Rural localities in Novousmansky District